Ponganadu is a village in the Thiruvananthapuram district, situated in the Indian state of Kerala. Madavoor (5 km), Nagaroor (6 km), Karavaram (7 km), Pulimath (7 km), Navaikulam (7 km) are other villages near Ponganadu.

Location
Ponganadu is situated in between National Highway 47 (India) and State Highway 1 (Kerala). It is near the Municipal towns of Varkala (17 km) and Attingal (18 km). The nearest airport is Trivandrum (Thiruvananthapuram) International Airport. The nearest railway station is Varkala Railway Station (Varkala Sivagiri Railway Station). It is around 42 km north of Thiruvananthapuram and 37 km south of Kollam, the two nearest cities.

Government and politics

Local government
Ponganadu is situated within Kilimanoor Panchayath and Chirayinkeezhu taluk.

Transport

Road
Ponganadu is 42 km away from Thiruvananthapuram.

  Ponganadu – Kallambalam: PWD road connects with NH 47
  Ponganadu – Paripalli: PWD road connects with NH 47
  Ponganadu – Kilimanoor PWD road connects with State Highway 1 (MC Road)
  Ponganadu – Thattathumala road connects with State Highway 1 (MC Road)

Rail
The nearest railway station is Varkala Sivagiri.

Air
The nearest airport is Thiruvananthapuram (Trivandrum) International Airport.

Tourism

 Ganapathi Para
 Vennichira Pond
 Kizhakkumkara Ancient Temple
 Padinjattinkara ancient Temple
 Thirupalkadal Sreekrishnaswamy Temple
 Vellallur Para

Religious centres

Temples
 Thirupalkadal Sreekrishnaswamy Temple

External links
 https://www.facebook.com/Grama-Darshan-Cultural-Society-Ponganadu-145281768991451/
 https://www.facebook.com/ponganadu/

References

Villages in Thiruvananthapuram district